Joe Thomas may refer to:

Entertainment
 Joe Thomas (alto saxophonist) (1908–?), Oklahoma-born jazz saxophonist and songwriter
 Joe Thomas (flautist) (1933–2017), New Jersey-born jazz flautist and saxophonist
 Joe Thomas (tenor saxophonist) (1909–1986), Pennsylvania-born jazz saxophonist
 Joe Thomas (trumpeter) (1909–1984), Missouri-born swing jazz trumpeter
 Joe Thomas (clarinetist) (1902–1981), New Orleans jazz clarinetist
 Joe Thomas (actor) (born 1983), English actor
 Joe Thomas (producer) (1956/1957), American record and television producer
 Joe (singer) (Joseph Lewis Thomas, born 1973), American R&B singer and record producer

Sports

American football
 Joe Thomas (American football executive) (1921–1983), head coach of the Baltimore Colts and NFL executive
 Joe Thomas (linebacker) (born 1991), American football player
 Joe Thomas (offensive tackle) (born 1984), former American football player
 Joe Thomas (wide receiver) (born 1963), former American football player
 Joey Thomas (born 1980), American football cornerback

Other sports
 Joe Thomas (racing driver) (1890–1965), American racecar driver
 Joe Thomas (basketball) (born 1948), American basketball player
 Joe Thomas (runner) (born 1988), Welsh middle distance runner
 Joe Thomas (rugby league) (born 1964), Australian former professional rugby league footballer
 Joe Thomas (rugby union) (born 1996), Welsh rugby union player
 Joe Thomas (footballer), English footballer

Others
 Joe Thomas (Alaska politician) (born 1948), Alaska state senator
 Joe Thomas (communist) (1912–1990), British communist activist
 Joe Thomas (talk show host) (born 1963), American political radio talk show host/program director

See also
 Joseph Thomas (disambiguation)

By Joe Doyne Thomas